Dan Curran (born October 28, 1976) is a former American football fullback, and currently the head football coach at Merrimack College in North Andover, Massachusetts. Curran became fifth head coach of the Merrimack football program after spending the three seasons as the offensive coordinator of one of the top offenses in the country. Curran has led the program to several marquee victories over the past three seasons, including the program’s first victory over a Division I opponent when it defeated reigning Northeast Conference champion and Division I FCS Tournament participant Wagner, as well as multiple wins over conference rival Bentley, two victories against conference power LIU Post, and the team's first-ever road win at the University of New Haven

Curran came to Merrimack after playing eight years of professional football which included time spent with the Seattle Seahawks and New Orleans Saints of the National Football League as well as the New Orleans Voodoo and Georgia Force of the Arena Football League. As a player in the Arena Football League, Curran earned First-team All-League Honors and was named to the All-Ironman Team after leading the league in rushing and becoming just the third player in league history at the time to rush for over 20 touchdowns in a season

He was hired as Merrimack head coach in February 2013.

Early years
Curran was named Boston Globe Player of the Year. He also earned All American status in USA Today and was named the 6th best player in New England by Super Prep Magazine. He led Chelmsford High School to a Super Bowl victory over Brookline High School.

College career
Curran attended the University of New Hampshire and played for Head Coach Sean McDonnell and Offensive Coordinator Chip Kelly earning Atlantic 10 honors his Senior year after rushing for 1,059 yards and scoring 16 touchdowns.

Head coaching record

References

External links
 Merrimack profile

1976 births
Living people
American football fullbacks
American football linebackers
Georgia Force players
Merrimack Warriors football coaches
Nashville Kats players
New Hampshire Wildcats football players
New Orleans VooDoo players
New Orleans Saints players
Seattle Seahawks players
People from Chelmsford, Massachusetts
Sportspeople from Middlesex County, Massachusetts
Players of American football from Massachusetts
Chelmsford High School alumni